Smirnykhovsky District is an administrative district (raion) of Sakhalin Oblast, Russia; one of the seventeen in the oblast. Municipally, it is incorporated as Smirnykhovsky Urban Okrug. It is located in the central part of the Island of Sakhalin. Its administrative center is the urban locality (an urban-type settlement) of Smirnykh. As of the 2010 Census, the total population of the district was 13,142, with the population of Smirnykh accounting for 56.3% of that number.

History
The district was established on January 16, 1965 from parts of the territory of Poronaysky District.

References

Notes

Sources

Districts of Sakhalin Oblast
States and territories established in 1965
